Amorite is an extinct early Semitic language, formerly spoken during the Bronze Age by the Amorite tribes prominent in ancient Near Eastern history. It is known from Ugaritic, classed by some as its westernmost dialect, and from non-Akkadian proper names recorded by Akkadian scribes during periods of Amorite rule in Babylonia (the end of the 3rd and the beginning of the 2nd millennium BC), notably from Mari and to a lesser extent Alalakh, Tell Harmal and Khafajah. Occasionally, such names are also found in early Egyptian texts; and one place name, "Sənīr" (שְׂנִיר) for Mount Hermon, is known from the Bible (Book of Deuteronomy).

Amorite is considered an archaic Northwest Semitic language, but there is also some evidence for other groupings.

Notable characteristics include the following:

 The usual Northwest Semitic imperfective-perfective distinction is found: Yantin-Dagan, 'Dagon gives' (ntn); Raṣa-Dagan, 'Dagon was pleased' (rṣy). It included a 3rd-person suffix -a (unlike Akkadian or Hebrew) and an imperfect vowel, a-, as in Arabic rather than the Hebrew and Aramaic -i-.
 There was a verb form with a geminate second consonant — Yabanni-Il, 'God creates' (root bny).
 In several cases that Akkadian has š, Amorite, like Hebrew and Arabic, has h, thus hu 'his', -haa 'her', causative h- or ʼ- (I. Gelb 1958).
 The 1st-person perfect is in -ti (singular), -nu (plural), as in the Canaanite languages.

In 2022, two large, 3,800-year-old, Amorite-Akkadian bilingual tablets were published, yielding a large corpus of Northwest Semitic.  The text is notably very similar to Classical Hebrew, and shows that by the early second millennium BC, there was already a spoken language very close to Hebrew, which before now has only been attested from the 10th century BC.

Notes

Further reading 

 
 
 I. Gelb. La lingua degli amoriti, Academia Nazionale dei Lincei. Rendiconti 8, no. 13 (1958): 143–163.
 Ignace J. Gelb, "Computer-aided Analysis of Amorite", Assyriological Studies 21, Chicago: University of Chicago Press, 1980
 
 Golinets, V. "Amorite Names Written with the Sign Ú and the Issue of the Suffixed Third Person Masculine Singular Pronoun in Amorite". In: Proceedings of the 53th Rencontre Assyriologique Internationale. Vol. 1: Language in the Ancient Near East (2 parts). Edited by Leonid E. Kogan, Natalia Koslova, Sergey Loesov and Serguei Tishchenko. University Park, USA: Penn State University Press, 2010. pp. 591-616. .
 Golinets, Viktor. "Amorite Animal Names: Cognates for the Semitic Etymological Dictionary". In: Babel und Bibel 9: Proceedings of the 6th Biennial Meeting of the International Association for Comparative Semitics and Other Studies. University Park, USA: Penn State University Press, 2016. pp. 55-86. 
 Howard, J. Caleb. "Amorite Names through Time and Space". In: Journal of Semitic Studies, 2023. fgac027. .
 H. B. Huffmon. Amorite Personal Names in the Mari Texts: A Structural and Lexical Study. Baltimore, 1965.
  Accessed 22 Jan. 2023.
Remo Mugnaioni. “Notes pour servir d’approche à l’amorrite” Travaux 16 – La sémitologie aujourd’hui. Aix-en-Provence: Cercle de Linguistique d’Aix-en-Provence, Centre des sciences du language, 2000, p. 57–65.
M. P. Streck. Das amurritische Onomastikon der altbabylonischen Zeit, vol. 1: Die Amurriter, Die onomastische Forschung, Orthographie und Phonologie, Nominalmorphologie. Alter Orient und Altes Testament Band 271/1. Münster, 2000.
 Streck, Michel P. "Amorite". In: The Semitic Languages: An International Handbook. Edited by Stefan Weninger. Berlin, Boston: De Gruyter Mouton, 2012. pp. 452-459.

External links
Cryptic lost Canaanite language decoded on 'Rosetta Stone'-like tablets - LiveScience - Tom Metcalfe- 30 January 2023 

 
Amorites
Northwest Semitic languages
Extinct languages of Asia
Languages attested from the 3rd millennium BC
Languages extinct in the 2nd millennium BC
Book of Deuteronomy